Alawi Saleh al-Salami (born in 1945 ) is a Yemeni politician and economist. Previously, he served as Deputy Prime Minister, Minister of Finance of Yemen.

Biography 
Alawi was born on 21 December 1945, in Rada'a, al-Bayda Governorate. He has a BA in economics and political sciences from Baghdad University. He held different positions including Minister of Finance (1986–1994), Governor of Yemen Central Bank (1994–1997), Minister of Finance (1997–2001), and deputy Prime Minister and Minister of Finance (2001–2006).

References 

1945 births
20th-century Yemeni politicians
General People's Congress (Yemen) politicians
21st-century Yemeni politicians
Finance ministers of Yemen
Deputy Prime Ministers of Yemen
People from Al Bayda Governorate
Yemeni economists
Living people